The Mumuye–Yendang languages are a proposed group of Savanna languages spoken in eastern Nigeria. They were labeled "G5" in Joseph Greenberg's Adamawa language-family proposal.

Mumuye languages
Yendang languages

Their unity is not accepted by Güldemann (2018).

Only Mumuye and Yendang proper have more than about 5,000 speakers. Mumuye is the most widely spoken Adamawa language.

Further reading
Shimizu, Kiyoshi. 1979. A comparative study of the Mumuye dialects (Nigeria). (Marburger Studien zur Afrika- und Asienkunde A14). Berlin: Dietrich Reimer.

Footnotes

References
Roger Blench, 2004. List of Adamawa languages (ms)

 
Leko–Nimbari languages